Phalaritica is a genus of moths in the family Momphidae.  There is only one species in this genus: Phalaritica vindex  Meyrick, 1913 that is found in Sri Lanka.

References

ftp.funet.fr
www.nhm.ac.uk

Momphidae
Moths of Sri Lanka